Live at the El Rey was a limited edition live album recorded by New Orleans electro-rock band Mutemath. The album was recorded live at the El Rey Theatre in Los Angeles on the Album Release Tour in January 2006 and features a selection of six songs from the actual set performed on the Album Release Tour. Video of the performances was also recorded and used for promotional materials on various online media outlets including AOL Music and was included in the UK physical release of the single "Typical". Only 25,000 copies of the EP were printed and sold as part of an exclusive limited edition version of the group's self-titled debut album Mutemath when it was re-released in the US on Warner Bros. Records on September 26, 2006. International releases also include the EP, but the number of copies printed is unknown. It is also available on iTunes as bonus tracks for the "deluxe" version of the self-titled album "MuteMath"

Track listing
 "Collapse" – 1:53
 "Typical" – 4:25
 "Chaos" – 4:32
 "Control" – 6:49
 "Noticed" – 6:09
 "Break the Same" – 9:29

Release history

2006 EPs
Mutemath albums
Live EPs
2006 live albums